Mohammad Barzegar (born July 24, 1976 in Tehran) is an Iranian footballer. He won the 2001–02 Iran Pro League with Persepolis.

Club Career Statistics

References

External links

Profile at teammelli.com

1976 births
Living people
Iranian footballers
Iran international footballers
Persepolis F.C. players
Fajr Sepasi players
Sanat Naft Abadan F.C. players
Tarbiat Yazd players
Shahrdari Bandar Abbas players
Association football wingers